Jake Kenneth Reed (born 28 September 1990) is an Australian cricketer. He plays for Victoria. He made his debut for the Hobart Hurricanes in the BBL04 on 2 January 2015.

References

1990 births
Living people
Australian cricketers
Victoria cricketers
Place of birth missing (living people)
Hobart Hurricanes cricketers